Massengo is a surname. Notable people with the surname include: 

Aloïse Moudileno Massengo (1933–2020), French-Congolese lawyer
Han-Noah Massengo (born 2001), French footballer
Jordan Massengo (born 1990), Congolese footballer

See also
Masengo

Surnames of African origin